The 5th Regiment Massachusetts Colored Volunteer Cavalry (or 5th Regiment, Massachusetts Cavalry (Colored)) was a cavalry regiment from Massachusetts, that served in the Union Army during the American Civil War.

Service
The regiment was organized from January 9-May 5, 1864, at Camp Meigs, Readville. From May 12, 1864, it served dismounted and equipped as infantry until the end of war.

Detailed service
The regiment fought at Baylor's Farm during the Second Battle of Petersburg and the Siege of Petersburg.

Casualties
The regiment lost 123 enlisted men; 7 enlisted men were killed or mortally wounded, 116 enlisted men died of disease.

Commanders
 Colonel Henry S. Russell (March 7-June 14, 1864; wounded at Baylor's Farm)
 Major Henry Pickering Bowditch (June 14-September 30, 1864)
 Colonel Henry S. Russell (September 30, 1864 – February 14, 1865; resigned)
 Colonel Charles Francis Adams, Jr. (February 14-August 1, 1865)
 Colonel Samuel Chamberlain (August 1-October 31, 1865; regiment mustered out)

Notable soldiers and officers
 Private Prince Romerson (c. 1840–1872), a Native Hawaiian soldier from the Kingdom of Hawaii who also fought as a Buffalo Soldier.
 Joshua Dunbar, the father of renowned American poet Paul Laurence Dunbar, served as a volunteer soldier in both the 5th Regiment Massachusetts Colored Volunteer Cavalry and the 55th Massachusetts Volunteer Regiment.
 Corporal William R. Meadows (c. 1842-May 6, 1868), moved to Claiborne Parish, Louisiana after the war. He served as a representative to the state constitutional convention of 1868 after Louisiana was readmitted to the Union.  He was murdered by unknown parties outside his home on the evening May 6, 1868.  [New Orleans Republican, May 22, 1868, p. 1]
 2nd Lt. Daniel Henry Chamberlain, who´d become Attorney General and eventually Governor of South Carolina.
 George Lawrence Mabson, who becomes the first black lawyer in North Carolina

See also

 List of Massachusetts Civil War Units
 Massachusetts in the Civil War

Notes

References

External links
 History of the 5th Regiment Massachusetts Colored Volunteer Cavalry by African American Military History
 History of the 5th Regiment Massachusetts Colored Volunteer Cavalry by The Civil War Archive
 History of the 5th Regiment Massachusetts Colored Volunteer Cavalry by FamilySearchBeta

Military units and formations established in 1864
Military units and formations disestablished in 1865
Units and formations of the Union Army from Massachusetts
Massachusetts Cavalry, 001
1864 establishments in Massachusetts
1865 disestablishments in Massachusetts